The Honiara Hotel is located in Chinatown in Honiara, Solomon Islands. This 56-hotel room establishment offers different grade levels of hotel rooms to accommodate an array of affordability.

Events
On Sunday, June 1, 1969, the hotel was opened with an event held between 17:30 and 19:30. It was attended by around 400 guests, including Tommy Chan's father Chan Wing.

During the April and May riots of 2006 in Honiara, Sir Tommy Chan (owner of the Honiara Hotel and a naturalized citizen of the Solomon Islands), the hotel, and his son's shop were targeted. However, they escaped damage and destruction due to support from local islanders, Christian brotherhood, and the police.

References

Bibliography

Buildings and structures in Honiara
Hotels in the Solomon Islands
Hotels established in 1969
Hotel buildings completed in 1969